In mathematics, informal logic and argument mapping, a lemma (plural lemmas or lemmata) is a generally minor, proven proposition which is used as a stepping stone to a larger result. For that reason, it is also known as a "helping theorem" or an "auxiliary theorem". In many cases, a lemma derives its importance from the theorem it aims to prove; however, a lemma can also turn out to be more important than originally thought. The word "lemma" derives from the Ancient Greek  ("anything which is received", such as a gift, profit, or a bribe).

Comparison with theorem
There is no formal distinction between a lemma and a theorem, only one of intention (see Theorem terminology). However, a lemma can be considered a minor result whose sole purpose is to help prove a more substantial theorem – a step in the direction of proof.

Well-known lemmas
A good stepping stone can lead to many others. Some powerful results in mathematics are known as lemmas, first named for their originally minor purpose. These include, among others:

 Bézout's lemma
 Burnside's lemma
 Dehn's lemma
 Euclid's lemma
 Farkas' lemma
 Fatou's lemma
 Gauss's lemma
 Greendlinger's lemma
 Itô's lemma
 Jordan's lemma
 Nakayama's lemma
 Poincaré's lemma
 Riesz's lemma
 Schur's lemma
 Schwarz's lemma
 Sperner's lemma
 Urysohn's lemma
 Vitali covering lemma
 Yoneda's lemma
 Zorn's lemma

While these results originally seemed too simple or too technical to warrant independent interest, they have eventually turned out to be central to the theories in which they occur.

See also

Axiom
Corollary
Co-premise
Fundamental lemma
Inference objection
List of lemmas
Objection
Porism
Theorem
Theorem terminology

Notes

References

External links
Doron Zeilberger, Opinion 82: A Good Lemma is Worth a Thousand Theorems

Mathematical terminology